Polystachya victoriae is a species of plant in the family Orchidaceae. It is found in Cameroon and Gabon. Its natural habitat is subtropical or tropical dry forests. It is threatened by habitat loss.

References

External links
 
 

victoriae
Orchids of Cameroon
Orchids of Gabon
Critically endangered plants
Taxonomy articles created by Polbot